The 2013 Kobalt Tools 400 was a NASCAR Sprint Cup Series stock car race held on March 10, 2013, at Las Vegas Motor Speedway in Clark County, Nevada. Contested over 267 laps on the 1.5 mile (2.4 km) asphalt tri-oval, it was the third race of the 2013 Sprint Cup Series championship. Matt Kenseth of Joe Gibbs Racing won the race, his first of the season. Kasey Kahne finished second while Brad Keselowski, Kyle Busch and Carl Edwards rounded out the top five.

The win was Kenseth's first win driving for Joe Gibbs Racing. He also became the third driver to win a Sprint Cup race on his birthday.

Report

Background

Las Vegas Motor Speedway is a four-turn,  D-shaped oval track that has sanctioned NASCAR Sprint Cup Series events since 1996. After being reconfigured in 2007, the track has a 20° banking in each of the turns, while the rounded front stretch and the back straightaway has a 9° banking. Las Vegas Motor Speedway also has a grandstand seating capacity of 138,000 people. The defending winner of the 267 lap, 400.5 mile (644.5 km) race was Tony Stewart, who won the race in 2012.

Before the race, Jimmie Johnson was leading the Drivers' Championship with 90 points, while Dale Earnhardt Jr. and Brad Keselowski stood in second and third with 82 points each. Denny Hamlin and Clint Bowyer followed in fourth and fifth with 72 points each, and was six ahead of Greg Biffle in sixth. Mark Martin with 65 was five points ahead of Jeff Gordon, Ricky Stenhouse Jr., and Aric Almirola, as Carl Edwards with 59 points was seven ahead of Marcos Ambrose. In the Manufacturers' Championship, Chevrolet and Ford were leading with fourteen points, four points ahead of their rival Toyota.

Entry list 
(R) - Denotes rookie driver

(i) - Denotes driver who is ineligible for series points

Practice and qualifying
As a result of Friday afternoon rain, qualifying was canceled for the first time in track history. With the field being set by the previous year's points standings, Brad Keselowski was awarded the pole position. Mike Bliss was the only driver not to qualify.

Race

The Race was held on March 10, 2013.

Results

Qualifying

Race results

Standings after the race

Drivers' Championship standings

Manufacturers' Championship standings

Note: Only the first twelve positions are included for the driver standings.

References

Kobalt Tools 400
Kobalt Tools 400
Kobalt Tools 400
NASCAR races at Las Vegas Motor Speedway